Yarden Cohen may refer to:

 Yarden Cohen (footballer, born 1991), Israeli footballer for F.C. Kafr Qasim
 Yarden Cohen (footballer, born 1997), Israeli footballer for Maccabi Petah Tikva